is a quasi-national park in Japan. The park protects the waters and surrounding coastline of the lakes and lagoons along the Sea of Okhotsk on Hokkaidō. This includes such lakes as Lake Abashiri and Lake Notoro as well as Lake Tōfutsu and Lake Saroma. Lake Saroma is the fourth largest lake in Japan. Most of the park lies within the limits of Abashiri in Abashiri Subprefecture of northeastern Hokkaidō.

The park includes a Marine Protected Area, which falls under the IUCN category Ib. The park is either 37261 ha or 43559 ha.

An important part of Abashiri Quasi-National Park is its floral display. Some of the most prominent species are in the following table.

See also
List of national parks of Japan

References

External links 
J-IBIS 

National parks of Japan
Parks and gardens in Hokkaido
Protected areas established in 1958
1958 establishments in Japan